Aaron A. Sargent (1827–1887) was a U.S. Senator from California 1873 to 1879. Senator Sargent may refer to:

Henry Sargent (1770–1845), Massachusetts State Senate
John Sargent (1799–1880), Massachusetts State Senate
Jonathan Everett Sargent (1821–1890), New Hampshire State Senate
Leonard Sargeant (1793–1880), Vermont State Senate